The Renault Access is a truck manufactured by Dennis Eagle and marketed by Renault Trucks. It is a rebadged version of the Dennis Eagle Elite 2.

In 2013, Renault Trucks unveiled at the Solutrans exhibition in Lyon a slightly updated version, now named the Renault Trucks D Access, which is still based on the Dennis Eagle truck.

Overview

A successor to the Renault Puncher, it is mainly used for the collection of household waste.

It is available in two variants of width.

References

External links
 Website of Renault Trucks France
 Renault Trucks unveils its new range
 2010 Renault Access press release (PDF; 89 kB)
 Images and information of the Access
 Official website of the Eagle Elite, the base vehicle of the Access

Access